La Obra Airport ,  is an airstrip serving Cumpeo, a small town in the Río Claro commune of the Maule Region in Chile.

See also

Transport in Chile
List of airports in Chile

References

External links
OpenStreetMap - La Obra
OurAirports - La Obra
FallingRain - La Obra Airport

Airports in Maule Region